The 1997 Porsche Tennis Grand Prix was a women's tennis tournament played on indoor hard courts at the Filderstadt Tennis Club in Filderstadt in Germany that was part of Tier II of the 1997 WTA Tour. It was the 20th edition of the tournament and was held from 6 October through 12 October 1997. First-seeded Martina Hingis  won the singles title, her second consecutive at the event.

Finals

Singles

 Martina Hingis defeated  Lisa Raymond 6–4, 6–2
 It was Hingis' 17th title of the year and the 23rd of her career.

Doubles

 Martina Hingis /  Arantxa Sánchez Vicario defeated  Lindsay Davenport /  Jana Novotná 7–6, 3–6, 7–6
 It was Hingis' 18th title of the year and the 24th of her career. It was Sánchez Vicario's 5th title of the year and the 78th of her career.

References

External links
 ITF tournament edition details

Porsche Tennis Grand Prix
Porsche Tennis Grand Prix
1997 in German tennis
1990s in Baden-Württemberg
Porsch